Guilford Place is a street in the London Borough of Camden.

It lies opposite and to the south of Coram's Fields. It runs north to south from Guilford Street to where it becomes Lamb's Conduit Street.

3-6 Guilford Place, the public conveniences and the drinking fountain are all Grade II listed by Historic England.

References

Streets in the London Borough of Camden